Cannonball Express may refer to:

 Cannonball Express, a steam locomotive operated by Casey Jones
 Cannonball Express (film), a 1932 film produced by Sono Art-World Wide Pictures
 Cannonball Express, a Friday afternoon train on the Long Island Rail Road departing from Penn Station and running non-stop to the Hamptons
 Cannonball Express, a planet in the fictional Known Space universe created by Larry Niven
 Cannonball Express, a roller coaster located at Pleasurewood Hills, Corton, Near Lowestoft, Suffolk
 Dreamworld Express, a narrow gauge railway located at the Dreamworld theme park
 The Cannonball Express, a song by jazz singer Peggy Lee
 The Cannonball Express, a band formed by the American electric blues guitarist, vocalist and songwriter, Toronzo Cannon
 The Cannonball Christmas Express, a special excursion train operated by the Tavares, Eustis & Gulf Railroad
 Wabash Cannon Ball, an express train line on the Wabash Railroad which ran from the late 1800s to the early 1900s, and again from 1950 to 1971
 Wabash Cannonball, an American folk song about a fictional Wabash Cannonball Express train
 Wabash Cannonball Express Railroad, a miniature train ride at the Indiana Beach amusement park